Farahabad or Ferehabad or Farehabad may refer to:

Farahabad, Hormozgan
Farahabad, Ilam
Farahabad, Kashan, Isfahan Province
Farahabad, Nain, Isfahan Province
Farahabad, Zangiabad, Kerman County, Kerman Province
Farahabad, Zarand, Kerman Province
Farahabad (Isfahan)
Farahabad, Kurdistan
Farahabad, Lorestan
Farahabad, Mazandaran
Farahabad, Amol, Mazandaran Province
Farahabad, Kashmar, Razavi Khorasan Province
Farahabad, Khvaf, Razavi Khorasan Province
Farahabad, Torqabeh and Shandiz, Razavi Khorasan Province
Farahabad, Semnan
Farahabad, Tehran
Farahabad, Khatam, Yazd Province